The 22nd Sarasaviya Awards festival (Sinhala: 22වැනි සරසවිය සම්මාන උලෙළ), presented by the Associated Newspapers of Ceylon Limited, was held to honor the best films of 1993 Sinhala cinema on April 2, 1994, at the Bandaranaike Memorial International Conference Hall, Colombo 07, Sri Lanka. Minister of Housing and Construction Sirisena Cooray was the chief guest at the awards nights.

The film Guru Gedara won the best awards with five including Best Film whereas film Saptha Kanya received six awards.

Awards

References

Sarasaviya Awards
Sarasaviya